Nikolaus Eglinger (1645–1711) was a Swiss physician, based in Basel.

Eglinger studied medicine at the University of Basel under Emmanuel Stupanus and Johann Bauhin. He produced a dissertation in 1661.

In 1690, Johann Bernoulli produced his dissertation under the supervision of Eglinger.

References

External links
 

1645 births
1711 deaths
Physicians from Basel-Stadt
University of Basel alumni
Academic staff of the University of Basel
17th-century Swiss physicians
18th-century Swiss physicians